Darasing Khurana (born 12 January 1992, Parbhani, Maharashtra) is an Indian actor, model, radio jockey, and male pageant titleholder who won Mr. India International 2017 and represented India at Mister International 2018 which was held in Yangon, Myanmar. He is also the Brand Ambassador for DATRI, an India-based blood stem cell donors registry. In 2021, he was awarded with the title Global Peace Ambassador.

Early life and background
Darasing Khurana was born on January 12, 1992, in the town of Parbhani, Maharashtra. His family is Punjabi. He attended Queen's School, Parbhani and Symbiosis College of Commerce and Economics, Pune and H.R. College of Commerce and Economics, Mumbai, before receiving a master’s degree in Business Management from the Narsee Monjee Institute of Management Studies (NMIMS).

Career
He started performing theatre at a tender age of 4. At the age of 14, he participated in Mr. Parbhani competition, a local pageant in his hometown, and won the competition. He later came to Mumbai, and graduated from H.R. College of Commerce and Economics there.

While he was studying, he became a part time model and walked the runway at numerous Indian and International fashion shows, including the Lakme Fashion Week, Bangalore Style Week, India International Style Week, India Luxury Style Week, as well as other fashion events. 

In 2017, he won the Rubaru Mr. India International  2017 and represented India at Mister International. 

Khurana has walked for several fashion shows as a show stopper and as a closing model, including Royal Fables. he also walked as a show stopper along with former Miss Universe Lara Dutta Bhupati at the page3 Awards.

Khurana is the Brand Ambassador of DATRI, an India-based blood stem cell donors registry. and Goodwill Ambassador of Kunwar Global School. He is also associated with the social cause ‘Daughters are precious’ in Rajasthan.

He is the founder of Pause.Breath.Talk Foundation, an initiative to help those suffering from mental health problems. 

Khurana is a part of UNICEF initiative and was invited to speak on the impact of climate change on children’s lives in an event held in November 2020.

Awards and recognition
2017: Awarded the Most Promising Face of the year at WOW Icon Personality Awards.
 2018: Received the ‘Style Icon of the year 2018’ at Rajasthan Style awards
 2018: Honored with Wow Starlite Excellence Awards in Pune
 2019: Honored with The Indian Achiever’s Award

See also
 Top Model India 
 Rohit Khandelwal
 Milind Soman
 Nitin Chauhaan

References

Living people
Indian male models
1992 births
Male beauty pageant winners
People from Maharashtra
Indian beauty pageant winners
Punjabi people